Aguelmame Sidi Ali  is a lake in Khénifra Province, Béni Mellal-Khénifra, Morocco. It is near the boundary of the province of Ifrane within the Middle Atlas mountains. It is part of Khenifra National Park, a  protected area created in 2008.

Description
It was formed in the Upper Miocene/Quaternary at the intersection of two faults. It is located in a natural hollow in the basalt rock and is formed from two basins, separated by a basal ridge which is exposed when the water level falls. It is fed by runoff, snowmelt and karst springs. The pH is 9.1 and the mineral content is relatively low with a conductivity of 1200–1600 uScm-1.

Ecology
The area surrounding the lake was once well-forested with Atlas cedar (Cedrus atlantica), but more recently, this forest has become degraded and the area around the lake has become dry, thorny scrubland dominated by Spanish juniper (Juniperus thurifera). The plankton and sediment in the lake is rich in diatoms, particularly of the genus Cyclotella, and these have been used to provide evidence of the paleohydrology and related hydroclimatic changes the lake has undergone over the aeons.

A decreasing trend in precipitation has lowered the water level of the lake, and a marsh that used to be at the southwest end no longer exists. The grazing of flocks of sheep and goats by nomadic herdsmen in the spring and summer has all but eliminated the aquatic vegetation at the edge of the lake. A reduced number of water birds visit the lake in winter and the great crested grebe no longer breeds here. Despite being protected, the ruddy shelduck and other wildfowl suffer from poaching.

The lake used to be the only place in the world where Salmo pallaryi, a native species of trout, lived but that fish became extinct after the common carp (Cyprinus carpio) was released into the lake in 1934. The northern pike (Esox lucius) and the zander (Sander lucioperca), are other non-native fish species also introduced in the lake.

References

Aguelmame Sidi Ali
Mountain lakes
Geography of Béni Mellal-Khénifra
Ramsar sites in Morocco